SGV Freiberg is a German association football club from the city of Freiberg am Neckar, Baden-Württemberg.

History
The club was formed out of the 1973 union of SGV Heutingsheim and TSV Beihingen. The roots of the Heutingsheim club go back to the establishment of FC Spartania Heutingsheim on 28 January 1913. This club fused briefly with SV Beihingen in 1919 to form FV Beihingen-Heutingsheim before the two went their separate ways again within a year. Spartania then formed a new partnership with TV Heutingsheim and RFV Wanderlust Heutingsheim in 1921 to create SV Heutingsheim. RFV left the association in 1926, while ASV TV Heutingsheim joined in 1933. Following World War II occupying Allied authorities banned all organizations in Germany, including sports and football clubs. The sports club was re-established in 1945 as SGV Heutingsheim.

TSV Beihingen made a fleeting appearance in the Amateurliga Württemberg (IV) in 1961–62 before the merger that formed SGV. The combined side was in and out of the Amateurliga Württemberg (V) through the course of the 90s. Since winning promotion to the Oberliga Baden-Württemberg (IV) on the strength of a Verbandsliga Württemberg (V) title in 2001 the football team has earned lower table results, eventually being relegated back to the Verbandsliga in 2011. It made an immediate return to the Oberliga after winning another Verbandsliga title and played there for four seasons with a third-place finish in 2014–15 as its best result but being relegated the following season.

In July 2013, Freiberg played a friendly match against Bundesliga side TSG 1899 Hoffenheim to mark SGV's 100-year anniversary, surprisingly beating them 2–1 thanks to goals from Spetim Muzliukaj and Ouadie Barini.

SGV plays its home matches at the Wasenstadion which has a capacity of 4,000 (800 seats).

In addition to its football side SGV has departments for accordion, basketball, gymnastics, Kung Fu, swimming, theatre, and volleyball.

Honours
 Verbandsliga Württemberg (V)
 Champions: 2001, 2012, 2017

Recent seasons
The recent season-by-season performance of the club:

 With the introduction of the Regionalligas in 1994 and the 3. Liga in 2008 as the new third tier, below the 2. Bundesliga, all leagues below dropped one tier.

References

External links

Das deutsche Fußball-Archiv historical German domestic league tables 

Football clubs in Germany
Football clubs in Baden-Württemberg
Association football clubs established in 1973
1973 establishments in West Germany